Antoine-Gabriel-François Benoist (October 6, 1715 January 23, 1776) was a soldier in the French army who served in important campaigns in North America.qClea

Antoine-Gabriel-François Benoist came to serve in Canada (New France) in 1735. He was with Jean-Baptiste Le Moyne de Bienville in an action against the Chickasaws in 1739. He held an important post as adjutant with François-Pierre de Rigaud de Vaudreuil in 1747. He also served for a period at Fort Saint Frédéric (on Lake Champlain) and as adjutant in Montréal. He undertook recruitment for Canada in France after his promotion to lieutenant.

References 
 

1715 births
1776 deaths
18th-century French military personnel